Hemimelia is a birth defect consisting in unilateral or bilateral underdevelopment of the distal part of the lower or upper limb. The affected bone may be shortened or not develop at all.

Types of hemimelia 
Transverse hemimelia is a congenital absence of part or all of a limb (including hand or foot) and is called amelia when the entire limb is missing.
Paraxial hemimelia means partial absence of one of the elements of the limb in the longitudinal axis (in phocomelia there is no complete absence of a part of the limb).

Sub types of hemimelia are the following:
 Fibular hemimelia, Congenital longitudinal deficiency of the fibula or fibular longitudinal meromelia
 Tibial hemimelia,  Congenital longitudinal deficiency of the tibia, Congenital aplasia and dysplasia of the tibia with intact fibula, Congenital longitudinal deficiency of the tibia or tibial longitudinal meromelia
 Radial hemimelia, Congenital longitudinal deficiency of the radius, radial clubhand, radial longitudinal meromelia or radial ray agenesis
 Ulnar hemimelia, Congenital longitudinal deficiency of the ulna, ulnar clubhand or ulnar longitudinal meromelia

References

External links 

Congenital disorders of musculoskeletal system
Congenital amputations
Genetic disorders with no OMIM